Hòa Lợi is a ward of Bến Cát town in Bình Dương Province, Vietnam.

References

Populated places in Bình Dương province